Tramutola is a village and comune in the province of Potenza, in the Southern Italian region of Basilicata (otherwise known as Lucania).

Cities and towns in Basilicata